Shreyas Talpade (born 27 January 1976) is an Indian actor, film director and producer who appears in Hindi and Marathi films. He has appeared in several critically and commercially successful films. He is better known for his role as Shah Rukh Khan's friend Pappu Master in Om Shanti Om (2007), the grand reincarnation melodrama of Farah Khan. He appeared in the comedies Golmaal Returns (2008), Welcome to Sajjanpur (2008), Golmaal 3 (2010), Housefull 2 (2012) and Golmaal Again (2017). Talpade also dubbed for Allu Arjun in the Hindi version of Pushpa: The Rise (2021).

Early life
Shreyas Talpade was born in Mumbai, Maharashtra on 27 January 1976. His father is the brother of actresses Meena T. and Jayshree T. (full name "Jayshri Talpade"). Shreyas attended Shree Ram Welfare Society’s High School in Andheri West followed by Mithibai College in Vile Parle. He is married to Deepti Talpade, a psychiatrist.

Career

Talpade began his acting career appearing in Marathi soap operas and doing stage shows across Maharashtra. He also appeared in the Zee TV soap opera Woh (1998) in which he was the main lead. He has also acted in mini-serials for the production "Adhikari Brothers". His role, in a very popular Marathi serial Aabhal Maya, as the character Tejas was very popular among Marathi audiences. He also appeared in Jaane Anjaane (2001) aired on doordarshan where he played the role of a son who dislikes his father because he felt that his father was the reason for his accident. Viewers liked the content of the same. Fame arrived after he made his Bollywood debut in Nagesh Kukunoor's Iqbal which was written by Vipul K Rawal in which he played the role of a deaf & mute youngster aspiring to be a cricketer. The film and his performance were well received by both audiences and critics. His next film was Kukunoor's Dor in which he played the comic role of a behroopiya, a man with many disguises. This film was also well received by critics.

In 2006, he starred in the comedy, Apna Sapna Money Money and in 2007, he starred in Farah Khan's blockbuster reincarnation drama, Om Shanti Om, with Shah Rukh Khan, where he played the role of Pappu Master, the best friend of Khan's character. In 2008, he was seen in Kukunoor's cross-cultural comedy film, Bombay To Bangkok. He also produced a Marathi film, Sanai Chaughade, which was released the same year. He also did movies like Shyam Benegal's Welcome to Sajjanpur, along with Golmaal Returns and Sangeeth Sivan's horror flick, Click. Shreyas was also seen in the horror film, Help. Shreyas next appeared in the movie Will You Marry Me? which released in 2012.

Shreyas has produced a Marathi film, titled Poshter Boyz, under his home production banner, Affluence Movies. The movie which released on 1 August 2014 was launched by Bollywood veteran Subhash Ghai. The film is directed by Sameer Patil and the music for it is composed by Lesle Lewis.

Poshter Boyz was remade in Hindi as Poster Boys and Shreyas made his directorial debut with this film which released on 8 September 2017. The film stars Shreyas himself along with Sunny Deol and Bobby Deol.

Filmography

Hindi

As a dubbing artist

Marathi

Television

Accolades

Public image 
In a series of sting operations carried out by Cobrapost code-named Operation Karaoke, Shreyas Talpade has been named as one of many celebrities who can be seen agreeing to promote the agenda of parties on social media platforms in exchange for money, on camera.

References

External links

 
 
 

1976 births
Living people
Marathi people
Male actors from Mumbai
Male actors in Hindi cinema
Male actors in Marathi cinema
Indian male film actors
Mithibai College alumni
Male actors in Marathi television
Screen Awards winners
Zee Cine Awards winners